Erigeron pallens is a species of flowering plant in the family Asteraceae known by the common name pale fleabane. It is native to the Rocky Mountains of western Canada (Alberta + British Columbia). There are some reports of the species in arctic regions but these populations have been reclassified under other species.

Erigeron pallens is a tiny, unbranching perennial herb rarely more than 10 centimeters (4 inches) tall, producing a woody taproot. The leaves are covered with wool. The plant generally produces only 1 flower head per stem, each head with 50–60 white, pink, or purple ray florets surrounding numerous yellow disc florets. The plant grows on rocky slopes in sparsely vegetated slopes.

References

pallens
Plants described in 1947
Flora of Western Canada
Flora without expected TNC conservation status
Taxa named by Arthur Cronquist